Jade Wilson (1977 – 14 May 1998) was a New Zealand female squash player representing the national team mainly in the junior level competitions. Jade Wilson is still remembered as one of the greatest ever junior squash players to have emerged from New Zealand and to have represented the country at junior level along with Stuart Davenport, Susan Devoy and Glen Wilson. She won the 1995 World Junior Squash Championships individual event in Sydney, which was her highest career performance. With this triumph, she also became the first ever New Zealander to win a Junior Squash Championship singles title. On 14 May 1998, she committed suicide in Perth after becoming an international professional player.

In 2013, Squash New Zealand recognised the Wilson's achievements and inducted her into the New Zealand Squash Hall of Fame, 15 years after her death.

Early life 
Wilson was born in 1977 and was raised in Wellington. She attended Wellington Girls' College. 

She started playing squash at the Tawa Club and was coached by Tony Naughton, who was her first coach. She also played squash in Mana Club and was coached by Rob Walker. She also hired Palmerston North based coach Barrie Matthews who later inspired her to win the Junior world title in 1995.

Career 
Wilson emerged at the international level for the first time at the age of 16, during the 1993 World Junior Squash Championships reaching semi-finals in the individual category and was part of the New Zealand squad which became runners-up to Australia at the team event. 

At the 1995 World Junior Squash Championships, she made history by winning the women's individual title in Sydney defeating favourite Australia's Rachel Grinham in the finals to secure her maiden title. After winning the 1995 Junior World title, she became the first and only player from New Zealand to become a Junior Squash World Champion. Despite her achievement, New Zealand failed to reach the final in the women's team event and had a third-place finish at the 1995 World Junior Squash Championships. She was named the Manawatu sportsperson of the year in 1995 for her memorable achievement of winning the 1995 Junior World title.

Besides the World Junior title, Wilson also emerged victorious at the 1995 British Junior Open Squash in the U19 category. 

She became a professional squash player in 1997 by achieving her highest ever career rating of 18.

Death  
Jade Wilson committed suicide on 14 May 1998 when she was 21 years old.

References

External links 

 

1977 births
1998 deaths
New Zealand female squash players
Sportspeople from Wellington City
1998 suicides
Suicides in Western Australia
People educated at Wellington Girls' College